is a railway station on the Hokuriku Railroad Ishikawa Line in the city of Hakusan, Ishikawa, Japan, operated by the private railway operator Hokuriku Railroad (Hokutetsu).

Lines

Station layout
The station consists of one side platform serving a single bi-directional track. The station is unattended.

Adjacent stations

History
Inokuchi Station opened on 1 August 1937.

Surrounding area
 Ishikawa Prefectural Route 179
 Meiko Elementary School

See also
 List of railway stations in Japan

References

External links

  

Railway stations in Ishikawa Prefecture
Railway stations in Japan opened in 1937
Hokuriku Railroad Ishikawa Line
Hakusan, Ishikawa